Vove (also rendered Bhubhi, Bubi, Pove) is a Bantu language of Gabon.

References

Languages of Gabon
Tsogo languages